The Beilstein Institute for the Advancement of Chemical Sciences is a non-profit foundation located in Frankfurt am Main (German: Beilstein-Institut zur Förderung der Chemischen Wissenschaften). Founded in 1951 by the Max Planck Society in honor of Friedrich Beilstein,  the institute is actively involved in maintaining the Beilstein database and the conversion of the contents of scientific libraries into electronic media.

In 2005, the institute initiated the open access Beilstein Journal of Organic Chemistry and in 2010 the Beilstein Journal of Nanotechnology.

External links

Scientific organisations based in Germany